The FIVB Beach Volleyball World Rankings is a ranking system for men's and women's national teams in beach volleyball. The teams of the member nations of the FIVB, beach volleyball and volleyball's world governing body, are ranked based on their competition results with the most successful teams being ranked highest.

The ranking is based on the 8 best results over the last 365 days. They are updated every Monday after an FIVB recognized event.

The rankings are used in international competitions to define the seeded teams and arrange them in pools. Specific procedures for seeding and pooling are established by the FIVB in each competition's formula.

Rankings

Men

Women

See also

Beach volleyball at the 2008 Summer Olympics - Qualification for the rankings going into the 2008 Summer Olympics

Notes and references 

World rankings
Beach volleyball